Shell 43 is a 1916 American war film written by C. Gardner Sullivan, from a story by Edward Sloman, and starring H.B. Warner, Enid Markey, and John Gilbert.

Plot
An English spy (played by H.B. Warner) works behind German lines during World War I. He saves the life of a German officer and is killed in a German trench by an Allied shell.

References

External links 
 
 

1916 films
American silent feature films
American black-and-white films
American war drama films
1910s war drama films
1916 drama films
Films directed by Reginald Barker
1910s American films
Silent American drama films
Silent war drama films
1910s English-language films